Giuseppe Pamphilj or Giacomo Pamphilj (1580–1622) was a Roman Catholic prelate who served as Bishop of Kotor (1620–1622).

Biography
Giuseppe Pamphilj was born in 1580. On 15 Jun 1620, he was appointed during the papacy of Pope Paul V as Bishop of Kotor. He served as Bishop of Kotor until his death in 1622.

References 

1580 births
1622 deaths
Roman Catholic bishops of Kotor
Bishops appointed by Pope Paul V
Montenegrin Roman Catholic bishops
17th-century Roman Catholic bishops in the Holy Roman Empire